Dr. Michelle Lynn Thaller is an American astronomer and research scientist. Thaller is the assistant director for Science Communication at NASA's Goddard Space Flight Center.

From 1998 to 2009 she was a staff scientist at the Infrared Processing and Analysis Center, and later Manager of the Education and Public Outreach program for the Spitzer Space Telescope, at the California Institute of Technology. She is a frequent on-camera contributor to programming on The History Channel and Science Channel.

Background 
A native of Wisconsin, Thaller graduated from Waukesha South High School in 1988.  She attended Harvard University, where she majored in astrophysics and worked on precision measurement of binary stars, receiving a bachelor's degree in 1992. At Georgia State University Thaller worked on colliding winds in close massive binary systems. She received a PhD in 1998.

Thaller is a regular contributor to the online edition of the Christian Science Monitor, for which she writes a monthly science column, and appears on the History Channel show, The Universe, and The Science Channel series How the Universe Works and The Planets and Beyond. In 2016 and 2017 Thaller authored and hosted the PRX/Sky & Telescope Orbital Path Podcasts series, and in 2008 contributed to and appeared in the NASA Spitzer Space Telescope's award-winning video podcast series IRrelevant Astronomy.

Personal life 
Thaller was married to astrophysicist Andrew Booth until his death in 2020. She lives in Maryland.

References

External links
 Video of Thaller's talk on "Living with a Star: Creating and Maintaining a Life-friendly Planet" in the Silicon Valley Astronomy Lecture Series

Living people
Harvard University alumni
Georgia State University alumni
American women astronomers
1969 births
NASA astrophysicists
People from Waukesha, Wisconsin
21st-century American women scientists